Evhen Tsybulenko (b. 21. October 1972 in Simferopol, Ukraine) is an Estonian legal scholar of Ukrainian descent. He is professor of law at the Tallinn University of Technology and Kyiv International University and is focused on International Humanitarian Law.

Academic career 
Tsybulenko graduated from Kiev National University in 1996 as LL.M. and obtained Ph.D. in International Law in 2000. He has conducted postdoctoral research at the International Human Rights Law Institute of De Paul University in Chicago during 2002, and has worked at the International Committee of the Red Cross and in Kyiv International University.

He was a founder and director of the Tallinn Law School Human Rights Centre during 2007-2014 and was elected as professor of law in 2005. Tsybulenko had been appointed as a Chair of International and Comparative Law department but due to the reorganisation of departments in 2010 International and Comparative Law department was closed. He has been an adjunct (visiting) professor and senior visiting mentor of Joint Command and General Staff Course (JCGSC) at Baltic Defence College.

Tsybulenko is an external expert of the International Committee of the Red Cross, Estonian Red Cross, Estonian Integration Commission, Directorate-General for Education and Culture of European Commission and the Organization for Security and Co-operation in Europe (OSCE). Tsybulenko also gives lectures at Warsaw International Humanitarian Law (IHL) International Summer Academy, Baltic Summer Academy, and Commonwealth of Independent States Summer School on IHL.

Tsybulenko has published more than 40 scientific books and articles as well as more than 200 general-interest articles, comments and interviews. Publications are primarily in English, Ukrainian and Russian. His articles and interviews has been translated to languages such as Estonian, French and Arabic.

Tsybulenko has taken also part on drafting laws e.g. he participated on preparation of a law concerning the protection of Red Cross and Red Crescent symbols in Ukraine as well as has provided assistance on a bill at Estonian Parliament to define Russias war in Ukraine as genocide against Ukrainians.

Political views 
Tsybulenko is known for his strong criticism against the Russian Federation. He has for example called for rebellion against the Russian law enforcement which caused a protest of Russian Embassy in Estonia and the embassy calling pro-Russia activists to propose termination of Tsybulenko Estonian citizenship.

Among other things Tsybulenko has condemned communist ideology as criminal, recognised Holodomor as a genocide against Ukrainians. Tsybulenko has also actively criticised the policies of the former Ukrainian President Yanukovych and his administration. He supports the Ukrainian Insurgent Army and have argued that it cannot be characterised as "nationalist" but rather "national liberation" movement. During the Russo-Georgian war, he supported Georgia. Tsybulenko has signed a number of appeals of the Russian opposition, including the Putin Must Go appeal in 2010.

In Estonian politics, he has presented right-wing views and often criticises the Estonian Center Party, a left-wing populist party immensely popular among non-Estonians.

Private life

Tsybulenko's father was general major Mykola Tsybulenko.

Tsybulenko acquired in 2009 Estonian citizenship for achievements of special merits.

Tsybulenko was the head of Ukrainian Community in Estonia (2017–19).

References

1972 births
Living people
People from Simferopol
Ukrainian humanitarians
Academic staff of Kyiv International University
Taras Shevchenko National University of Kyiv alumni
International law scholars
Academic staff of the Tallinn University of Technology
Ukrainian emigrants to Estonia